The FTSE EPRA Global Real Estate Index is a stock market index series jointly managed by EPRA (Brussels), FTSE (UK) and NAREIT (US), composed of property company constituents that trade on several global exchanges. 

The European Public Real Estate Association (EPRA), is a non-profit association representing Europe's publicly listed property companies. It is run by an independent management board chaired by Christophe Cuvillier, CEO of Unibail-Rodamco. EPRA's CEO is Dominique Moerenhout.

Decisions taken regarding a constituent's inclusion or exclusion from the various index categories of the FTSE EPRA/NAREIT Index series are taken by the index committee for that region, quarterly, on the last day of trading after hours. The decisions are strictly governed by the index ground rules.

References

External links
www.epra.com
European stock market indices